Rafał Marek Szukała (born 9 April 1971 in Poznań) is a former butterfly swimmer from Poland, who won the silver medal in the men's 100 m butterfly at the 1992 Summer Olympics in Barcelona, Spain.

Szukała competed in three consequentive Summer Olympics for his native country, starting in 1988. Szukała won his first major title in 1989, at the 1989 European Aquatics Championships in Bonn, in the 100 m butterfly. He regained the European title in 1993. Szukala also won gold in the 1994 World Championships in the 100 m butterfly.

He attended the University of Iowa, in the United States.

External links
Profile on Polish Olympic Committee
Profile

1971 births
Living people
Polish male butterfly swimmers
Olympic swimmers of Poland
Swimmers at the 1988 Summer Olympics
Swimmers at the 1992 Summer Olympics
Swimmers at the 1996 Summer Olympics
Olympic silver medalists for Poland
Sportspeople from Poznań
World Aquatics Championships medalists in swimming
Medalists at the FINA World Swimming Championships (25 m)
European Aquatics Championships medalists in swimming
Iowa Hawkeyes men's swimmers
University of Iowa alumni
Medalists at the 1992 Summer Olympics
Olympic silver medalists in swimming
20th-century Polish people